Rob McEwen, CM (born April 15, 1950) is a Canadian businessman. He is the chairman and chief executive officer of McEwen Mining and was the founder and former chairman and chief executive officer of Goldcorp. In January 2019, Goldcorp merged with Newmont creating Newmont Goldcorp Corporation, the second largest gold mining company in the world. McEwen followed his father into the investment industry and also developed a passion for gold.  As of 2016 he is one of the top one-hundred wealthiest Canadians, with an estimated personal net worth over $800 million.

McEwen devised an innovative approach to exploration when he published maps and geological data on one of Goldcorp's properties and invited scientists and engineers around the world to analyze the data and submit drilling plans to Goldcorp to help it find its next gold deposit. Normally such data is considered proprietary and confidential in the exploration and mining industry and some of Mr. McEwen's colleagues were horrified at the idea of publishing the company's proprietary data. Goldcorp offered prize money of $500,000 for the best drilling ideas. The response was overwhelming and more than 1400 participants submitted drilling plans to the company, leading to further gold discoveries.

A graduate of St. Andrew's College in 1969, McEwen later earned a Bachelor of Arts from the University of Western Ontario and a Master of Business Administration from the Schulich School of Business. Rob also holds an Honorary Doctor of Laws Degree from York University. McEwen is a member of WPO, the Canadian Council of Chief Executives and the Dean's Advisory Board, Schulich School of Business.  In 2008, McEwen was invested in the Order of Canada, the country's highest civilian honor.

With his wife, Cheryl, McEwen co-founded the McEwen Centre for Regenerative Medicine. Cheryl McEwen (née Mason) has served as Vice-Chair of the Toronto General & Western Hospital Foundation Board since 2005, which is part of the University Health Network, and is the founder of Make My Day Foods Inc., manufacturer of the Veggie Puck.

Rob McEwen was inducted into the Canadian Mining Hall of Fame in 2017.

References

External links 
 

1950 births
Businesspeople from Toronto
Canadian people of Scottish descent
Canadian philanthropists
Living people
Members of the Order of Canada
Schulich School of Business alumni
University of Western Ontario alumni
York University alumni
St. Andrew's College (Aurora) alumni